Marie Brenden (27 February 1938 – 31 July 2012) is a Norwegian educator and politician for the Labour Party.

She was born in Kvam, Nord-Trøndelag as a daughter of smallholders Arnfinn Forfang (1913–1994) and Mimmi Haave (1912–1985). She finished secondary education in 1959, and took teacher's college in 1962. She spent most of her career at the primary school Saksheim in Saksumdal near Fåberg, where she was headmaster from 1979 to 1985.

Brenden was a member of the executive committee of Lillehammer municipal council from 1975 to 1983, and of the executive committee of Oppland county council from 1983 to 1987. She was elected to the Parliament of Norway from Oppland in 1985, and was re-elected on two occasions in 1989 and 1993. She served as a deputy representative during the term 1981–1985. She was a member of the Standing Committee on Social Affairs from 1985 to 1993, except from 1989 to 1990 when she was a member of the Standing Committee on Justice. For her last term she was a member of the Standing Committee on Defence, and was also party whip and parliamentary secretary.

Brenden chaired the small sports club Rinna IL from 1980 to 1982. From 1983 she worked with getting the 1994 Winter Olympics to Lillehammer, and from 1988 to 1993 she was a member of the Lillehammer Olympic Organising Committee.

References

1938 births
2012 deaths
Politicians from Lillehammer
Oppland politicians
Labour Party (Norway) politicians
Members of the Storting
Norwegian sports executives and administrators
Norwegian Lutherans
Heads of schools in Norway
20th-century Norwegian politicians
20th-century Lutherans